Richard or Dick Lowe may refer to:
Richard Barrett Lowe (1902–1972), American politician
Richard Lowe (MP), Member of Parliament (MP) for Calne
Richard Lowe (footballer) (1915–1986), English footballer
Richard Lowe (cricketer, born 1869) (1869–1946), English cricketer
Richard Lowe (cricketer, born 1904) (1904–1986), English cricketer
Richard Thomas Lowe (1802–1874), British botanist, ichthyologist, malacologist and clergyman
Dick Lowe (baseball) (1854–1922), baseball player
Dick Lowe (politician),  member of the Oklahoma House of Representatives